Carlos Mario Oquendo Zabala (born November 16, 1987, Medellín) is a Colombian racing cyclist (BMX style). Carlos was selected to represent Colombia at the London 2012 Summer Olympics in the men's BMX category, and won the bronze medal in that competition.

References

1987 births
Living people
Cyclists at the 2012 Summer Olympics
Cyclists at the 2016 Summer Olympics
Olympic cyclists of Colombia
Colombian male cyclists
Olympic bronze medalists for Colombia
Olympic medalists in cycling
Medalists at the 2012 Summer Olympics
Sportspeople from Medellín
South American Games gold medalists for Colombia
South American Games medalists in cycling
Competitors at the 2014 South American Games
20th-century Colombian people
21st-century Colombian people
Competitors at the 2014 Central American and Caribbean Games
Competitors at the 2018 Central American and Caribbean Games